The 2015–16 season was Cardiff City's 99th season in their existence and the 88th in the Football League, their second consecutive season in the Championship. Along with competing in the Championship, the club will also participate in the FA Cup and League Cup. The season covers the period from 1 July 2015 to 30 June 2016.

Competitions

Championship

League table

Results by matchday

Kit

|
|
|

Squad

 Appearances and goals for the club are up to date as of 7 May 2016.

Statistics

|-
|colspan=14|First team players out on loan:

|-
|colspan=14|Loan Players who returned to their parent clubs:

|-
|colspan=14|First team players that left the club:

|}

Captains

Goals record

Total includes 1 own goal

Disciplinary Record

Suspensions served

Contracts

Transfers

In

Loans in

Out

Total income:  £4,400,000

Loans out

Fixtures and Results

Pre-season

Football League Championship

FA Cup

League Cup

Development Team

Overall summary

Summary

Score overview

Club staff

Backroom staff

Board of directors

References

Cardiff City F.C. seasons
Cardiff City
Cardiff